Graphium schubotzi is a butterfly in the family Papilionidae (swallowtails). It is found in eastern Cameroon, the Republic of the Congo, the Central African Republic and the Democratic Republic of the Congo. Its habitat consists of the forest/savanna transition zone.

Subspecies
Graphium schubotzi schubotzi (eastern Cameroon, Congo, Central African Republic, Democratic Republic of the Congo)
Graphium schubotzi maculata Libert, 2007  (Cameroon)

Taxonomy
Graphium schubotzi belongs to a species group with 16 members. All are very similar
The species group members are:
Graphium abri Smith & Vane-Wright, 2001 
Graphium adamastor  (Boisduval, 1836) 
Graphium agamedes (Westwood, 1842)
Graphium almansor (Honrath, 1884)
Graphium auriger (Butler, 1876) 
Graphium aurivilliusi (Seeldrayers, 1896)
Graphium fulleri  (Grose-Smith, 1883)
Graphium hachei (Dewitz, 1881)
Graphium kigoma Carcasson, 1964
Graphium olbrechtsi Berger, 1950
Graphium poggianus (Honrath, 1884)
Graphium rileyi Berger, 1950
Graphium schubotzi (Schultze, 1913)
Graphium simoni (Aurivillius, 1899),
Graphium ucalegon  (Hewitson, 1865)[
Graphium ucalegonides (Staudinger, 1884)

References

External links
Butterfly corner Images from Naturhistorisches Museum Wien
External images

schubotzi
Butterflies described in 1913